"House at Pooh Corner" is a song written by Kenny Loggins, based on the children's book of the same name. It was first performed by the Nitty Gritty Dirt Band on their 1970 album Uncle Charlie & His Dog Teddy.

Background
It is told from the perspective of both Winnie-the-Pooh and Christopher Robin, and serves as an allegory for loss of innocence and nostalgia for childhood. Loggins was a 17-year-old senior in high school when he wrote the song.

Reception

Loggins & Messina recording
It was later recorded by Loggins and Messina on their 1971 album Sittin' In.

Personnel
 Kenny Loggins - lead vocals, classical acoustic guitar
 Jim Messina - harmony vocals, acoustic guitar
 Jon Clarke - oboe
 Al Garth - recorder
 Larry Sims - bass, backing vocals
 Merel Bregante - drums, backing vocals
 Michael Omartian - Moog synthesizer, Hammond organ, piano
 Milt Holland - shakers, temple blocks, congas, cabasa, gong

Other versions
In 1977, CCM singer Scott Wesley Brown covered the song for his album I'm Not Religious, I Just Love the Lord.
In 1994, Loggins re-recorded the song (with an additional verse) under the title "Return to Pooh Corner", a duet with Amy Grant, featuring backing vocals from Grant's then-husband, Gary Chapman. It appears on his album of the same title.
The song was recorded in 2007 by Australian artist Josh Pyke for radio station Triple J. The live recording was then released on the third volume of the station's Like a Version compilation CDs. Phillip Sandifer also recorded the song for Disney's Winnie the Pooh Lullabies in 2004.
The Boxmasters, featuring Billy Bob Thornton, included it on their album The Boxmasters.
It was also recorded by the folk rock duo The Indigo Girls.

Samples
This song was sampled in Daft Punk's "Face to Face".

Popular culture
The song was also recorded in three-part harmony by the characters Jesse (John Stamos), Joey (Dave Coulier), and Danny (Bob Saget) on the 1980s television series Full House in Season 8: episode 15, "My Left and Right Foot" (183rd episode of the series) on January 31, 1995.

References 

1971 singles
Nitty Gritty Dirt Band songs
Kenny Loggins songs
Winnie-the-Pooh songs
Songs written by Kenny Loggins
Liberty Records singles
Columbia Records singles
Loggins and Messina songs
1970 songs
Songs about fictional male characters